Dr. Mahmud bin Ahmad, known as Abu Handzalah (25 September 1978 – 7 June 2017), was a Malaysian professor of Islamic law and a senior Islamic militant with Abu Sayyaf in the Philippines.

History

He was born in Batu Caves, Gombak District, Selangor.

In the 1990s he travelled to Pakistan to study, where he obtained two bachelor's degrees from the International Islamic University, Islamabad. In the late 1990s he is said to have attended an Al-Qaeda training camp in Afghanistan. He has a master's degree from the International Islamic University Malaysia and a Doctoral degree from the University of Malaya. While teaching at the University of Malaya, he was a senior lecturer in the Department of Aqidah and Islamic Thought in the Academy of Islamic Studies.

According to fellow teachers at the University of Malaya, it was in late 2013 that he began expressing openly his views with respect to jihad. He wrote a journal titled "Faith of the Mujahidin" and founded a religious school called Open Tahfiz Centre.

In March 2014, he arranged for at least four Malaysians to travel to Syria to join the Islamic State of Iraq and the Levant.

He has been on the Malaysian most wanted list since he travelled to the Philippines in July 2014.

According to the head of the Philippine Armed Forces, General Eduardo Año, he was killed on  7 June 2017 along with 13 militants during the Battle of Marawi in the Philippines. It was alleged Mahmud funnelled over 30 million pesos from the Islamic State to gain firearms, food and other supplies to finance the militants' siege on Marawi. However, Malaysian police chief Khalid Abu Bakar said he believed Mahmud is still alive.

References

1978 births
2017 deaths
Islamic State of Iraq and the Levant members
Academic staff of the University of Malaya
University of Malaya alumni
International Islamic University Malaysia alumni
International Islamic University, Islamabad alumni
Malaysian rebels
Malaysian imams
Terrorism in Malaysia
Terrorism in the Philippines
People from Selangor
Malaysian Islamists